The twenty-fifth edition of the Caribbean Series (Serie del Caribe) was played in . It was held from February 4 through February 9 with the champion teams from Dominican Republic (Tigres del Licey), Mexico (Tomateros de Culiacán), Puerto Rico (Lobos de Arecibo) and Venezuela (Tiburones de La Guaira). The format consisted of 12 games, each team facing the other teams twice. The games were played at Estadio Universitario in Caracas, Venezuela. Bowie Kuhn, the Commissioner of Major League Baseball, attended the Series, and the first pitch was thrown by Oscar Prieto, Leones del Caracas majority owner and one of the series brainchild.

Summary
The Puerto Rico team was piloted by Ron Clark. After being mauled by the Dominicans in the opening, 17-2, Arecibo crushed the Mexicans 9-1 and defeated Venezuela, 7-6, in 11 innings. Later, a solid effort came from Kevin Hagen and Rich Bordi, both pitching complete games, to beat Mexico and the Dominican Republic. By beating Venezuela and Mexico in their last two games, the Lobos ended with a 5-1 mark en route to winning one of the most celebrated victories in Puerto Rican baseball history. Outfielder Glenn Walker was selected as Most Valuable Player and was chosen for the All-Star Team along Candy Maldonado and Dickie Thon. Other significant members of the roster included pitchers John Hobbs, Gary Lance and Edwin Núñez; catcher Orlando Mercado; infielders Ramón Avilés, Onix Concepción and Wayne Tolleson, as well as utilities Henry Cruz, Carmelo Martínez and Ken Phelps.

Venezuela, managed by Ozzie Virgil, finished in second place with a 4-2 record and also had the only shutout in the Series, by Rick Anderson, who limited the Mexicans to five hits while striking out nine. Second baseman Derrel Thomas paced the Tiburones offense, hitting .476 (10-for-21) to win the batting title and slugged .714. Other contributions came from right fielder Tony Armas (.269 BA, 3 HR, 6 RBI, .654 SLG), first baseman Ron Jackson (.360, 2 HR, 6 RBI, .680 SLG) and reliever Luis Aponte (1-0, one save, six SO in 6.0 innings of work). Other roster members included pitchers Bryan Clark, Luis Leal, Luis Sánchez, Albert Williams and Matt Young; catchers Bruce Bochy and Baudilio (Bo) Díaz; infielders Dave Concepción and Leo Hernández; outfielders Robert Marcano and Luis Salazar, and utilities Ozzie Guillén, Argenis Salazar and Manny Trillo.

The Dominican Republic, guided by Manny Mota, finished 3-3 and had to settle for a modest third place. The most prominent players were catcher Luis Pujols, third baseman Howard Johnson and outfielder César Gerónimo, who were included in the All-Star Team. Meanwhile, pitchers Alejandro Peña, Cliff Speck and David Grier got the victories. The Licey team also featured players such as Steve Baker (P), Tony Fernández (SS), Alfredo Griffin (2B), Pedro Guerrero (1B), Mike Howard (IF/OF),  Rafael Landestoy (OF), Ted Martínez (IF), Orlando Peña (P) and Rafael Santana (IF).

Tomateros de Culiacán, led by catcher/manager Francisco Estrada, presented an All-Mexican squad which included local legends such as Cy Acosta (P), Salomé Barojas (P), Nelson Barrera (1B), Bobby Cuellar (P), Maximino León (P), Aurelio López (3B), Mario Mendoza (SS), Vicente Romo (P) and Jesús Sommers (DH). But the opportune hitting and strong defense were undermined by below average running speed and poor bullpen support. Mexico finished with a 0-6 record, to become the second winless team in Series history.

Scoreboards

Game 1, February 4

Game 2, February 4

Game 3, February 5

Game 4, February 5

Game 5, February 6

Game 6, February 6

Game 7, February 7

Game 8, February 7

Game 9, February 8

Game 10, February 8

Game 11, February 9

Game 12, February 9

See also
Ballplayers who have played in the Series

Sources
Antero Núñez, José. Series del Caribe. Impresos Urbina, Caracas, Venezuela
Araujo Bojórquez, Alfonso. Series del Caribe: Narraciones y estadísticas, 1949-2001. Colegio de Bachilleres del Estado de Sinaloa, Mexico
Figueredo, Jorge S. Cuban Baseball: A Statistical History, 1878 - 1961. Macfarland & Co., United States
González Echevarría, Roberto. The Pride of Havana. Oxford University Express
Gutiérrez, Daniel. Enciclopedia del Béisbol en Venezuela, Caracas, Venezuela

External links
Official site
Latino Baseball
Series del Caribe, Las (Spanish)

 
 

Caribbean Series
Caribbean Series
International baseball competitions hosted by Venezuela
Sports competitions in Caracas
1983 in Caribbean sport
1983 in Venezuelan sport
Caribbean Series
20th century in Caracas